Antarashat is a village in the Kapan Municipality of the Syunik Province in Armenia.

Etymology 
The village was previously known as Tort’in, Tort’n, Tortni, Dort’ni and Torini.

Demographics 
The Statistical Committee of Armenia reported its population as 120 in 2010, down from 131 at the 2001 census.

Gallery

References 

Populated places in Syunik Province